Maca District is one of twenty districts of the province Caylloma in Peru.

See also 
 Colca River
 Hualca Hualca

References

Districts of the Caylloma Province
Districts of the Arequipa Region